Nat Mauldin is an American screenwriter and film producer.

Writing Credits
Barney Miller (1981-1982) (TV)
Newhart (1983) (TV)
Night Court (1984-1987) (TV)
Have Faith (1989) (TV)
Downtown (1990)
Howie and Rose (1991) (TV)
Capitol Critters (1992) (TV)
The Preacher's Wife (with Allan Scott) (1996)
Dr. Dolittle (with Larry Levin) (1998)
The In-Laws (with Andrew Fleming) (2003)
Open Season (with Steve Bencich and Ron J. Friedman) (2006)
The Perfect Holiday (with Lance Rivera, Marc Calixte and Jeff Stein) (2007)
A Christmas Story 2 (2012)

External links

Year of birth missing (living people)
Living people
American male screenwriters
American film producers
American television writers
American male television writers
Sony Pictures Animation people